The 2013–14 Indiana State Sycamores basketball team represented Indiana State University during the 2013–14 NCAA Division I men's basketball season. The Sycamores, led by fourth year head coach Greg Lansing, played their home games at the Hulman Center and were members of the Missouri Valley Conference. They finished the season 23–11, 12–6 in MVC play to finish in second place. They advanced to the championship game of the Missouri Valley Conference tournament where they lost to Wichita State. They were invited to the National Invitation Tournament where they lost in the first round to Arkansas.

Roster

Schedule

|-
!colspan=9 style="background:#0F4D92; color:#FFFFFF;"| Exhibition

|-
!colspan=9 style="background:#0F4D92; color:#FFFFFF;"| Regular season

|-
!colspan=9 style="background:#0F4D92; color:#FFFFFF;"| Missouri Valley tournament

|-
!colspan=9 style="background:#0F4D92; color:#FFFFFF;"| NIT

References

Indiana State Sycamores men's basketball seasons
Indiana State
Indiana State
Indiana State Sycamores men's basketball
Indiana State Sycamores men's basketball